North Park Theological Seminary is a seminary located in the North Park neighborhood of Chicago, Illinois. It is the sole graduate theological school of the Evangelical Covenant Church.

History 
In 1891, the school was founded by the Evangelical Covenant Church in Minneapolis.  In 1894, the school moved to Chicago. 

The seminary shares a campus with North Park University, the denomination's liberal arts college. The seminary's main building, Nyvall Hall, is named after David Nyvall, who was instrumental in the formation of the school and served as professor and president for many years.

Though retaining some of its Swedish roots, North Park Theological Seminary is now a multi-ethnic institution that fully supports women in ministry.

Programs 
The institution's academic programs include a Master of Arts (MA) in Christian Ministry, Master of Arts in Theological Studies, Master of Arts in Christian Formation, Master of Divinity (M.Div.), Doctor of Ministry (D.Min.) in Preaching, and various certificate programs.

The seminary is accredited by the Association of Theological Schools.

Notable alumni and faculty
 Klyne Snodgrass, New Testament scholar and author
 Timothy Johnson, medical journalist

References

External links
 North Park Theological Seminary official website
 Evangelical Covenant Church

Evangelicalism in Illinois
Evangelical seminaries and theological colleges
Seminaries and theological colleges in Illinois
Universities and colleges affiliated with the Evangelical Covenant Church
North Park, Chicago